Amazon Watch is a nonprofit organization founded in 1996, and based in Oakland, California, it works to protect the rainforest and advance the rights of indigenous peoples in the Amazon Basin. It partners with indigenous and environmental organizations in Ecuador, Peru, Colombia and Brazil in campaigns for human rights, corporate accountability and the preservation of the Amazon's ecological systems.

Campaigns
In 1964, the Texaco Petroleum Company, in partnership with Gulf Oil, began exploring for oil in Northeast Ecuador.  In 1974, the Government of the Republic of Ecuador, acting through the state-owned oil agency Petroecuador, obtained a 25% interest.  Two years later, Petroecuador acquired Gulf Oil's interest and became a 62.5% owner of the Lago Agrio oil field.  By 1993, Petroecuador had also acquired Texaco's interest.  After Texaco completed environmental remediation, the Government of Ecuador inspected and certified the work and ”absolved, liberated and forever freed” Texaco Petroleum from “any claim or litigation by the Government of Ecuador.”  Nevertheless, in November 1993, a group of Ecuadorians filed a class action lawsuit on behalf of 30,000 inhabitants of the Oriente region, alleging that Texaco polluted the rain forests.  After extensive litigation, the U.S. Court of Appeals affirmed in Aguinda v. Texaco an earlier court's dismissal on the basis of "forum non conveniens."   Thus, legal proceedings were started in Ecuador in 2003.

In 2011, a decision in Ecuador ordered Chevron to pay $9.5 billion. Ecuador's Supreme Court in 2013 affirmed the trial court judgment in a 222-page decision that documented the extensive and life-threatening levels of oil pollution at dozens of former Chevron well sites in the jungle. In all, eight appellate judges in Ecuador reviewed the evidence against Chevron and affirmed the judgment, as well as dismissing Chevron's allegation of fraud. When Chevron refused to comply with the $9.5 billion judgment against it for contamination in the Lago Agrio oil field, the plaintiffs' lead attorney, Steven R. Donziger, attempted to collect the judgment in Brazil, Argentina, and Canada. Chevron then filed suit in the United States, and relying on the Racketeer Influenced and Corrupt Organizations Act (RICO Act), alleged that plaintiffs' attorneys in the Lago Agrio litigation had engaged in extortion and fraud by paying almost US$300,000 in bribes to obtain the 2011 court verdict in Ecuador. On 4 Mar 2014, Judge Lewis A. Kaplan concluded that "the course of justice was perverted" and enjoined Donziger from instituting any enforcement proceedings in the United States. Donziger has appealed to the U.S. Court of Appeals, Second Circuit.

Amazon Watch's web page describes its activities in Ecuador as going "beyond supporting indigenous efforts to keep their territories intact and win greater rights guarantees, Amazon Watch is also promoting visionary alternatives that could protect the Amazonian environment and local communities. The Yasuni ITT initiative is one such initiative for which we have actively campaigned. The proposal seeks to keep some 900 million barrels of heavy crude that lies underneath Yasuni National Park permanently in the ground in exchange for half of the forgone oil revenues. If done right, the proposal is an important first step towards keeping oil reserves in culturally sensitive and fragile ecosystems in Ecuador and beyond".

Additionally, Amazon Watch is a plaintiff in a case against the US oil company Occidental for its damage to the Peruvian rainforest. The District Court initially granted Occidental's motion to dismiss without ruling on whether Amazon Watch had standing to sue.  On appeal, the 9th Circuit Court overturned the dismissal and the Supreme Court declined review.  Amazon Watch also supported the Achuar indigenous people in opposing oil exploration on their lands by the Canadian oil company Talisman and the Argentinian company Pluspetrol. Moreover, Amazon Watch supports a school that trains indigenous leaders how to defend their rights against oil and mining companies.

In Brazil, the Brazilian government is building the world's third largest hydroelectric dam on the Xingu River, one of the Amazon's major tributaries. The Belo Monte dam complex would divert 80 percent of the Xingu River's flow, devastating an area of over 1,500 square kilometers of rainforest, and resulting in the forced displacement of up to 40,000 people. With the people of the Xingu and a network of Brazilian and international NGOs, Amazon Watch is working to document and publicize the dam's drastic impacts on local and indigenous populations.

Amazon Watch reports that the current rate of deforestation threatens to push the Amazon past a tipping point from which it cannot recover. Reports say that in the last 30 years, 20 percent of the Amazon has been deforested and another 20 percent degraded – all fueled by clearing land for agriculture and large-scale industrial projects such as oil and gas pipelines, dams and roads.

In 2014 Amazon Watch set up Amazon Watch Sweden as an independent nonprofit organization in order to increase fundraising efforts as well as increase advocacy pressure in Europe. 

In September 2016 Amazon Watch released a report which concludes that imports of crude oil by the US are driving rainforest destruction in the Amazon and releasing significant greenhouse gases.

On 6 February 2020, the environmental organization Mobilize Earth debuted Guardians of Life, the first of twelve short films that highlight the most pressing issues facing humanity and the natural world. Funds raised by the project will go to Amazon Watch and Extinction Rebellion.

References

Further reading

External links
 Amazon Watch – Official website
 Journalist Exposes How Chevron Tried to Recruit Her as a Spy to Undermine $27B Suit in Ecuadorian Amazon - video report by Democracy Now!

Amazon rainforest
Amazon basin
Forest conservation organizations
Environmental organizations based in California
Indigenous activists of the Americas
Indigenous topics of the Amazon
Non-profit organizations based in California
Organizations based in Oakland, California
Organizations established in 1996
1996 establishments in California